Aria Party (also spelled Arya and Ariya) was a monarchist and nationalist political party in Iran known for its pro-British policy and staunch anti-Communist tendency. It was alleged to have been financed by the Imperial State.

Along with other small right-wing parties such as Pan-Iranist Party, it blamed all the social ills of Iranian society on the Muslim conquest of Persia.

General Hasan Arfa was the leader of the party. The party had an active military wing, an entourage of Imperial Iranian Army officers, led by Deyhami. However the real mastermind behind it was Hassan Akhavi, who organized events culminating in the 1953 Iranian coup d'état. Hossein Manouchehri, Aminzadeh, Yahyayi and Mahmoud Eram were among the distinguished members.

Members of the party wore gray shirts and caps and mimicked German Nazi appearance. Overall, the party had National Socialist tendencies.

References

1946 establishments in Iran
Anti-Arabism in the Middle East
Political parties established in 1946
Monarchist parties in Iran
Fascist parties
Political parties in Pahlavi Iran (1941–1979)
Iranian nationalism
Far-right political parties
Anti-communist parties
Fascism in Iran
Nationalist parties in Iran